Ali Awaji (born 2 August 1989) is a Saudi professional footballer who plays as a winger for Radwa.

External links

References

1989 births
Living people
Saudi Arabian footballers
Saudi Arabia international footballers
Al-Majd Club players
Ohod Club players
Al-Wehda Club (Mecca) players
Al-Ahli Saudi FC players
Al-Tai FC players
Al-Entesar Club players
Radwa Club players
People from Medina Province (Saudi Arabia)
Association football wingers
Saudi First Division League players
Saudi Professional League players
Saudi Second Division players
Saudi Fourth Division players
Saudi Third Division players